Tetragonia eremaea is a member of the genus Tetragonia and is endemic to Australia.

It blooms between August and October producing yellow-green flowers.

The plant is often found over granite or limestone and has a scattered distribution throughout the Mid West and Goldfields-Esperance regions of Western Australia where it grows in sandy, loamy or clay soils.

The species was first formally described by the botanist Carl Hansen Ostenfeld in 1921 in the article Contributions to West Australian Botany, part III : Additions and notes to the flora of extra-tropical W. Australia. in the journal Biologiske meddelelser, Kongelige Danske Videnskabernes Selskab.

References

eremaea
Flora of Western Australia
Plants described in 1921